Funky Chicken may refer to:
"Do the Funky Chicken", a 1969 song by Rufus Thomas
The Chicken (dance), a 1960s-era American rhythm and blues dance
Chicken Dance, an oom-pah song